Chapelle or LaChapelle is a French surname. Notable people with the surname include:

Corinne Chapelle (1976–2021), French American violinist
David LaChapelle (born 1963), photographer and director
Dickey Chapelle (1918–1965), photojournalist and war correspondent
Dolores LaChapelle (1926–2007), deep ecologist
Edward LaChapelle (1926–2007), avalanche forecaster, mountaineer, skier, author, and professor
Jean de La Chapelle (1651–1723), French writer and dramatist
Howard I. Chapelle (1901–1975), maritime historian
Marie-Louise Lachapelle (1769–1821), pioneering French midwife

See also
Chappelle

French-language surnames